Delta Delphini, Latinized from δ Delphini, is a binary star in the northern constellation of Delphinus. It is visible to the naked eye with an apparent visual magnitude of 4.43. Based upon an annual parallax shift of 14.61 mas as seen from the Earth, the system is located about 223 light years from the Sun.

This is a double-lined spectroscopic binary system with an orbital period of 40.58 days. The two components are nearly identical chemically peculiar stars, having a combined stellar classification of kA7hF1VmF1pSrEuCr:. This notation indicates the calcium K line matches an A7 star, the hydrogen lines an F1 star, and the metal lines an F1 star, with particularly strong lines of strontium, europium, and chromium. Each of the stars is a Delta Scuti variable, with the system having a dominant period of 0.1568 days and an amplitude of 0.0700 in magnitude. Delta Delphini forms the prototype of a class of metal-lined δ Scuti subgiant or giant stars.

References

External links

A-type main-sequence stars
F-type main-sequence stars
Delta Scuti variables
Am stars
Spectroscopic binaries
Delphinus (constellation)
Delphini, Delta
Delphini, 11
197461
102281
7928
Durchmusterung objects